Jason Banks (born 16 November 1968, Farnworth) is an English former footballer who made two appearances in The Football League for Chester City.

Banks began his career at Wigan Athletic but moved on to Chester in October 1987 without making any league appearances. The following month saw him make his professional debut as a substitute for Paul Maddy in Chester's 1–0 win over Port Vale. He subsequently started in Chester's next league game against Walsall and an FA Cup tie against Runcorn before dropping into non–league football with Atherton Collieries.

Bibliography

References

1968 births
Living people
People from Farnworth
English footballers
Association football fullbacks
Wigan Athletic F.C. players
Chester City F.C. players
Atherton Collieries A.F.C. players
English Football League players